Greedo Tetsu Jr. is a fictional character in the Star Wars franchise. He was a Rodian bounty hunter from the Tetsu Clan and worked for gangster Jabba the Hutt. Greedo's Huttese language is based on Quechua, the Inca language. He appears in the first Star Wars film during a scene where he confronts and threatens Han Solo, only to be killed by Solo. The scene was later altered so that Greedo also shoots at Han, leading to the infamous fan controversy known as "Han shot first" with which the character has since come to be best-known.

Greedo was portrayed in 1977 by Paul Blake, as well as Maria De Aragon for some close-in pickup shots in 1977, while a younger version of him was played by Simon Rose and Oliver Walpole in a deleted scene from the 1999 prequel film Star Wars: Episode I – The Phantom Menace. The character has made appearances in a few other pieces of Star Wars media, including the 2008 animated series Star Wars: The Clone Wars and the 2015 video game Star Wars Battlefront.

Appearances

Star Wars (1977) 
Greedo is a Rodian bounty hunter working for Jabba the Hutt in Star Wars: A New Hope. Jabba hires him to capture Han Solo, who lost the Hutt's cargo during a smuggling mission while evading pursuit from an Imperial Star Destroyer. Greedo tracks his target to the Mos Eisley cantina on Tatooine, where Han kills him with a concealed blaster.

The Star Wars Holiday Special (1978)
The 1978 Star Wars Holiday Special depicts a being strikingly resembling Greedo in both species and clothing, known as "Bludlow". Bludlow is seen at the Cantina, although no relation between Greedo and him is known, other than being both Rodians. Nevertheless, the bountyhunter Koh'Wa Phœur is also seen in the cantina in episode IV. In the Christmas episode we learn that both are close friends.

A Rodian named "Ludlo" was described as the brother of Greedo during a 1978 marketing campaign.

In 2014, The Star Wars Holiday Special, already of the lower "S-Canon" canonicity level, was declared non-canonical and part of the separate Star Wars Legends continuity, which takes place in a different universe. Despite this, Bludlow was recanonized with the 2018 novel Star Wars: Last Shot, a tie-in to the film Solo: A Star Wars Story, of the same year.

The Phantom Menace (1999) 
In Star Wars: Episode I – The Phantom Menace, a young Greedo wrestles with a young Anakin Skywalker in a deleted scene set on Tatooine. The scene was shot to demonstrate the violence potential that would have led Anakin to become Darth Vader, but George Lucas decided that Anakin should have been completely good in Episode I, to begin his downfall to evil later.

Star Wars: The Clone Wars (2010) 
Greedo also appears in the 2010 Star Wars: The Clone Wars episode "Sphere of Influence". In this series, set 21 years before A New Hope, Greedo is hired by the Trade Federation to kidnap Baron Papanoida's daughters, Che Amanwe and Chi Eekway. He and his accomplices are ultimately foiled by Ahsoka Tano as well as the Baron and his son.

Other media 
 Marvel Comics's Star Wars #2, titled Six Against the Galaxy, an adaptation of the 1977 film, features the character in the iconic scene with Han.
Greedo has appeared as a playable character in most Lego Star Wars video games: Lego Star Wars II: The Original Trilogy (2006), Lego Star Wars: The Complete Saga (2007), Lego Star Wars III: The Clone Wars (2011), Lego Star Wars: The Force Awakens (2016), and Lego Star Wars: The Skywalker Saga (2022).
 In Star Wars Battlefront , Greedo is one of the seven playable villains featured in the game. On March 22, 2016, he was added along with the hero character Nien Nunb as part of the Outer Rim downloadable content.
 Greedo's youth & backstory appear in A Hunter's Fate:Greedo's Tale, by Tom Veitch and Martha Veitch, collected in Tales from the Mos Eisley Cantina.

Portrayal 
In Star Wars, Paul Blake played Greedo during the main shooting, while an articulated head was built afterward and used by Maria De Aragon for pick-up shots. Linguist Larry Ward performed the voice. Tom Kenny providing the voice in the Star Wars: The Clone Wars television series.

Han shot first 

In 2012, director George Lucas expressed his dissatisfaction with the Han-Greedo scene, believing that it depicts Solo, the film's supporting protagonist, as a "cold-blooded killer". Lucas had altered the scene for the 1997 Special Edition re-release so that Greedo shoots first at Solo and misses, and then Solo returns fire, killing Greedo. The scene was altered again for the 2004 DVD release so that the shots are fired at nearly the same time and so that Solo dodges Greedo's shot.

Some fans objected to the revisions to the original film, even generating an online petition demanding that the changes be retracted. The primary objection to the revision is that it alters Han's initially morally ambiguous character, making his later transition from anti-hero to hero less meaningful. Lucas stated in 2012 that Greedo has always shot first, and his revisions to the film only served to "clean up the confusion".

The scene was altered again for the version of Star Wars released on the Disney streaming service, Disney+, on November 12, 2019. In this version, Greedo says a line transcribed by fans as "maclunkey" or "ma klounkee" before shooting at Han. The line may be a threat spoken in Huttese, as it is used that way by Sebulba in The Phantom Menace. Additionally, the reverse shot of Greedo being shot was removed. The changes were made by Lucas before Disney acquired the Star Wars rights in 2012.

References

External links 

 
 

Villains in animated television series
Characters created by George Lucas
Extraterrestrial supervillains
Fictional bounty hunters
Fictional contract killers
Film characters introduced in 1977
Fictional henchmen
Fictional humanoids
Fictional kidnappers
Fictional murdered people
Fictional reptiles
Male film villains
Star Wars comics characters
Star Wars literary characters
Star Wars Skywalker Saga characters
Star Wars television characters
Star Wars video game characters
Film supervillains